The Saudi ambassador in Moscow is the official representative of the Government in Riyadh to the Government of Russia. He is the Custodian of the Embassy of Saudi Arabia in Moscow. 

In September 1990 full diplomatic relations were restored between the Saudi government and the Government of the Soviet Union.

List of representatives

See also
Russia–Saudi Arabia relations

References 

 
Russia
Saudi Arabia